La Paz Valley is a census-designated place (CDP) in La Paz County, Arizona, United States. Its population was 368 as of the 2020 census. The community is in western La Paz County and is bordered to the north by the town of Quartzsite. To the south it is bordered by Yuma County.

U.S. Route 95 forms the eastern border of the CDP and runs north into Quartzsite and south  to Yuma. The Town of Quartzsite operates demand response buses under the name Camel Express that provide weekday service to Quartzsite and La Paz Valley.

Demographics

References

External links
 

Census-designated places in La Paz County, Arizona